Hà Tây was a former province of Vietnam, in the Red River Delta, now part of Hanoi. On May 29, 2008 the decision was made to subsume the province into the city of Hanoi. The merger took place on August 1, 2008. The name of the province was a name blending of two former provinces, Hà Đông and Sơn Tây.

Geography 
Hà Tây province was located in the Red River Delta bordering Hanoi municipality, Hưng Yên, Hà Nam, Hòa Bình, and Phú Thọ provinces. The Kinh account for 99% of the province's population; the remaining population is of the Muong and Dao ethnic groups.

The tropical monsoon climate is divided into three geographic microclimates: the plains, with a hot and humid climate dominated by marine winds; the foothills, with a continental climate affected by western winds; and the montane centering on the peaks of Ba Vì, with a cool climate and an average temperature of 18 °C.

Famous sites include Chùa Hương (Perfume Pagoda), Tay Phuong Pagoda, and hundreds of caves, which were used as homes. Most festivals and activities in Hà Tây take place during the 1st, 2nd, and 3rd months after Tết. The most famous are the pilgrimage to Hương Pagoda, along with the Thầy Pagoda and Tay Phuong Pagoda Festivals

Hà Tây province lay to the southwest of the entrance to the capital city of Hanoi. For this reason all the tourist attractions of province are around 50 km from the centre of Hanoi and easily accessible by land.

Administrative divisions 
Before being merged into Hanoi City on August 1, 2008, Hà Tây was subdivided into 14 district-level sub-divisions:

 12 districts:
 Ba Vì
 Chương Mỹ
 Đan Phượng
 Hoài Đức
 Mỹ Đức
 Phú Xuyên
 Phúc Thọ
 Quốc Oai
 Thạch Thất
 Thanh Oai
 Thường Tín
 Ứng Hòa
 2 provincial cities:
 Hà Đông (former capital, and currently an urban district within Hanoi) 
 Sơn Tây (currently a district-level town within Hanoi)

At the time, those were further subdivided into 22 commune-level towns (or townlets), 405 communes, and 26 wards.

Festivals
In Hà Tây, it is worthy to mention festival tour first because it lasts all the year round. All the festivals bear typical characteristics of traditional festivals of North delta (Red River) which show the religious belief or respect of the inhabitants for different gods and heroes. Each festival can be considered as a living museum containing culture, traditions of the nation to be represented by different ceremonies such as statue-bathing, fish-catching, etc. or by folk games as wrestling, water puppet, Chèo Singing, Do Singing, cooking contests, etc.

Some festivals in Hà Tây province are well known in Vietnam and the world of which Perfume (Hương) Pagoda is the most noteworthy because it is the longest and most interesting, attracting about half a million visitors every year. Next attention should be paid to Do Singing Festival in Quốc Oai district which is only organised once in the every 36 years; Chèo Tàu Boat Singing Festival being performed once in every 30 years; Other famous festivals are Thầy Pagoda festival, Kite-flying festival in Ba Giang- Đan Phượng, Tây Phương Pagoda festival, Dâu Pagoda festival, Va temple festival, Hatmon temple festival.

Culture, history and religion 
Hà Tây province was a very old land, having long history, which leads to the appearance of 2,388 cultural, historical, and religious relics of which 12 relics are famous and being classified by Ministry of Culture and Information as especially important. These are:

 Thầy Pagoda being closely linked to a famous monk Từ Đạo Hạnh
 Bối Khê Pagoda, Trăm Gian (100 room) Pagoda being belonging to a hero called Nguyễn Bình An
 Tây Phương Pagoda – cultural essence of Tây Sơn regime time
 Mia Pagoda, which has the most Buddhist statues in Vietnam (287)
 Đậu Pagoda is unique in the sense that it has two real (corpse) statues of two monks; several renowned communal houses such as Tay Dang, Chu Quyen, Dai Phu, Hoa Xa.

References

External links 
 

Former provinces of Vietnam